Djibouti – United States relations are bilateral relations between Djibouti and the United States.

History 

In April 1977, the United States established a consulate general in Djibouti and, upon independence in June 1977, raised the status of its mission to an embassy. The first U.S. ambassador to the Republic of Djibouti arrived in October 1980. Over the past decade, the United States has been a principal provider of humanitarian assistance for famine relief and has sponsored health care, education, good governance and security assistance programs.

Djibouti has allowed the U.S. military, as well as other nations' militaries, access to its port and airport facilities. The Djiboutian Government has been very supportive of U.S. and Western interests particularly during the Gulf crisis of 1990-91 and after the terrorist attacks of September 11, 2001. In 2002, Djibouti agreed to host a U.S. military presence at Camp Lemonnier, a former French Foreign Legion base outside the capital that now houses approximately four thousand personnel. U.S. service members provide humanitarian support and development as well as security and counterterrorism assistance to people and governments of the Horn of Africa and Yemen. As a victim of past international terrorist attacks, President Guelleh continues to take a very proactive position against terrorism. "The fact that we welcome the U.S. forces in our country show our support for international peace and for peace in our region as well," Said Guelleh. "We do that all for peace in the world and for peace in Africa."

In 2014, the U.S. reached a long-term agreement with the government of Djibouti to continue utilizing Camp Lemonnier. The U.S. military also uses airstrips in more remote parts of the country for drone operations. Outside of the base agreement, President Barack Obama also pledged to increase financial aid to Djibouti, including helping to expand skills training and foreign aid.

Embassy 
Principal U.S. officials include:
 Ambassador – Larry André Jr.

See also 
 Foreign relations of the United States
 Foreign relations of Djibouti

External links
History of Djibouti - U.S. relations
Embassy of U.S.A. - Djibouti

References 

 
Bilateral relations of the United States
United States